John Treadwell (November 23, 1745 – August 18, 1823) was an American politician and the 21st Governor of Connecticut.

Biography
Treadwell was born in Farmington, Connecticut the only son of Ephraim and Mary (Porter) Treadwell, on November 23, 1745. He graduated from Yale University in 1767. He then studied law with Judge Titus Hosmer in Middletown, was admitted to the bar and practiced law in Farmington. On November 20, 1770, John Treadwell married Dorothy Pomroy, of Northampton, Massachusetts. They had four daughters, Dolle 1st, who died at just three years of age; Dolle 2nd; Eunice; and Mary, and two sons, George and John.

Career
Treadwell served as a member of the General Assembly from 1776 to 1783. He was then elevated to the governor's council. He held that position until 1783. He was elected to the Confederation Congress in 1784, 1785, and 1787, but did not attend. He was a member of Connecticut council of assistants from 1786 to 1798. From 1786 to 1797 he served as Judge of the Court of Common Pleas. In 1788 he was a Delegate to the state convention that ratified the US Constitution. In 1789 Treadwell became Judge of the Probate Court and the Supreme Court of Errors, serving until 1809. He was elected a Fellow of the American Academy of Arts and Sciences in 1805.

In 1798, Treadwell was elected the Lieutenant Governor of Connecticut, an office he also held until 1809. Jonathan Trumbull, the Governor of Connecticut, died in office on August 7, 1809. Treadwell, lieutenant governor at the time, assumed the governor's office. He was elected by popular vote on April 9, 1810, to the governorship. During his term, the Hartford Fire Insurance Company was proposed, and the Non-Intercourse Act was reinstated in February 1811, which resulted from Connecticut's opposition to the United States's impending war with Great Britain.

Treadwell left office on May 9, 1811 after an unsuccessful re-election bid. In 1814-15 he was a Connecticut delegate to the Hartford Convention. He was a member of the 1818 Constitutional Convention and also served on the American Board of Commissioners for Foreign Missions.

Death
Treadwell, a Congregationalist, died in Farmington, Hartford County, Connecticut, on August 18, 1823 (age 77 years, 268 days). He is interred at Farmington Old Cemetery. He was a founder of the Connecticut Missionary Society, the missionary arm of the Connecticut General Association of Congregational ministers.

References

External links
 Sobel, Robert and John Raimo. Biographical Directory of the Governors of the United States, 1789-1978. Greenwood Press, 1988. 

1745 births
1823 deaths
Governors of Connecticut
People from Farmington, Connecticut
Fellows of the American Academy of Arts and Sciences
Yale University alumni
Members of the Connecticut General Assembly Council of Assistants (1662–1818)
Members of the Connecticut House of Representatives
Connecticut Federalists
Lieutenant Governors of Connecticut
Federalist Party state governors of the United States
American Congregationalists
People of colonial Connecticut
Burials in Connecticut